The  is a river in Kanagawa and Tokyo Prefectures on Honshū, Japan. It begins at the confluence of the Onda and Yamoto rivers in Yokohama and flows 22 kilometers before emptying into Tokyo Bay.

External links
 (mouth)

Rivers of Tokyo
Rivers of Kanagawa Prefecture
Rivers of Japan